Divinity is a 2023 American science fiction thriller film directed by Eddie Alcazar in his feature length debut and starring Scott Bakula, Stephen Dorff, Bella Thorne, Moises Arias, Jason Genao, and Karrueche Tran. The film had its premiere at Sundance Film Festival on January 21, 2023.

Plot 
Set in an otherworldly human existence, scientist Sterling Pierce dedicated his life to the quest for immortality, slowly creating the building blocks of a groundbreaking serum named “Divinity.” Jaxxon Pierce, his son, now controls and manufactures his father's once-benevolent dream.

Cast 

 Bella Thorne as Ziva
 Stephen Dorff as Jaxxon Pierce
 Scott Bakula as Sterling Pierce
 Moises Arias as Star
 Karrueche Tran as Nikita
 Jason Genao as Star
 Caylee Cowan as Felicity
 Michael O'Hearn as Rip
 Emily Willis as Lynx
 Sawyer Jones as Young Jaxxon
 Danielia Maximillian as Divinity Specimen
 Elisha Herbert as Purity Protector
 Renee Herbert as Purity Protector
 Lydia Bielen as Purity Captive
 Tyler Prince as Divinity Specimen

Production 
Steven Soderbergh and Eddie Alcazar announced in September 2021 that they were collaborating on a new film with Alcazar directing and Soderbergh producing. In April 2022, Scott Bakula and Bella Thorne joined the cast, and DJ Muggs would compose the music. The movie uses stop-motion for an extended fight scene. The movie was made without a script according to Bella Throne "There is no script for this film, so I was trusted with the virtue of doing my own thing. And I started drawing and sketching ideas, and that’s pretty much how it all came about."

Release 
The film had its premiere at Sundance Film Festival January 21, 2023.

References

External links 

 

2023 films
2023 directorial debut films
American science fiction thriller films
Films shot in California
2020s science fiction thriller films
2020s English-language films
2020s American films